Masterminds is a 2016 American crime comedy film based on the October 1997 Loomis Fargo robbery in North Carolina. Directed by Jared Hess and written by Chris Bowman, Hubbel Palmer and Emily Spivey, the film stars Zach Galifianakis, Owen Wilson, Kristen Wiig, Kate McKinnon, Leslie Jones and Jason Sudeikis.

It premiered in Los Angeles on September 26, 2016 and was theatrically released in the United States on September 30, 2016, by Relativity EuropaCorp Distribution and Relativity Media. The film received mixed reviews from critics and grossed $30 million.

Plot
In March 1997, after Loomis Fargo & Company has been robbed of $18.8 million in Jacksonville by company security guard Philip Noel Johnson, Steve Eugene Chambers and Kelly Campbell, a former employee of Loomis, decides to rob the company. They involve Loomis armored car driver David Scott Ghantt. 

After some awkward training in preparation for the robbery, the team has David go inside Loomis' vault and load the entire money supply into the company's van. Before he leaves, he takes out three CCTV tapes, but misses one. The next day, David flees to Mexico with $20,000 and takes the cover name "Michael McKinney", which is the name of a friend of Steve's. Meanwhile, Steve takes most of the heist, around $17 million.

FBI Special Agent Scanlon and her partner take the case, and immediately have David as the prime suspect, but have no idea of Steve's involvement. Steve plans to cut him loose but Kelly thinks it would be wrong to abandon him. 

In Mexico, David narrowly evades three Interpol agents looking for him, and calls Kelly about what happened. He inadvertently learns Steve's name from the ID in a wallet that Kelly gave him. With his cover blown, Steve hires the real, but unstable hitman, Michael McKinney to hunt David down. He finds David and attempts to shoot him, but the gun backfires and he escapes. 

David phones Kelly and learns that Steve is trying to kill him, and will not send the money for him as expected. David is then knocked unconscious by McKinney. When heregains consciousness, McKinney is about to kill him but reconsiders upon looking at "McKinney"'s birth certificate, thinking that David was born under the same circumstances; they become friends.

David calls Steve, threatening to surrender himself to Interpol if he does not wire $6 million into his bank account within two days. Kelly is then attacked by Jandice, who learns of her involvement with David, at the mall and escapes. When Steve refuses to wire the money, his two friends kidnap Kelly and he tells David to get a ticket to South America in exchange for her release. 

At the airport, David meets McKinney, who is returning to the U.S., but as he bids farewell he sees Kelly's name written on his hand and tells him that she is his girlfriend. Realizing that he cannot bring himself to kill her, they switch tickets just as the three Interpol agents attempt to catch David.

While Steve is hosting a party, the FBI puts a wire on one of the party members in an attempt to record Steve's confession. David sneaks in and rescues Kelly. They escape by stealing Steve's BMW but it crashes as they attempt to drive through the gate. Steve catches and assaults him, until David realizes he is near the FBI van with the agents inside. 

David tricks Steve into admitting that he was the mastermind of the whole plan, giving the agents enough reason to arrest all of them, including Kelly. David is sentenced to seven years in prison, while Steve served eleven years. About $2 million is still unaccounted for. Upon David's release, he is picked up by McKinney and they drive to visit Kelly.

Cast
 Zach Galifianakis as David Scott Ghantt
 Kristen Wiig as Kelly Campbell
 Owen Wilson as Steven Eugene "Steve" Chambers
 Jason Sudeikis as Michael Aaron "Mike" McKinney
 Kate McKinnon as Jandice Gartrell
 Leslie Jones as FBI Special Agent Scanlon
 Mary Elizabeth Ellis as Michelle Chambers
 Ken Marino as Doug
 Karsten Friske as Cort Chambers
 Dallas Edwards as Ken Chambers
 Devin Ratray as Runny
 Jon Daly as Detective
 Ross Kimball as Eric
 Jordan Israel as Valet
 Njema Williams as Ty
 Kerry Rossall as Trunk Hostage

Production
On February 1, 2013, Jim Carrey joined the cast. On June 10, 2013, Owen Wilson joined the cast of the film. On December 3, 2013, Zach Galifianakis joined the cast to replace Carrey after he dropped out. On May 16, 2014, Kristen Wiig joined the cast, and on June 25, 2014, Jason Sudeikis was added as well. On June 30, 2014, Ken Marino, Kate McKinnon, Devin Ratray, Leslie Jones, Mary Elizabeth Ellis and Ross Kimball joined the cast. On July 10, Jon Daly joined the cast of the film to play an FBI agent. The film was produced by Brent Almond. David Ghantt was a technical consultant for the film, but due to outstanding court-ordered restitution for his part in the heist he was not paid.

Filming
The title used in media coverage was Untitled Armored Car. Principal photography began on July 7, 2014, in Old Fort and Swannanoa, North Carolina in the Asheville area. On July 29, Galifianakis was spotted in a prisoner's costume, during filming in the streets of downtown Asheville, which were made over. The BB&T Center building, also the location of the production office, was transformed into the "Park Street Citizens Bank", with a Loomis Fargo burgundy truck parked outside of the entrance. The crew also shot the film on the steps of Buncombe County Courthouse, inside of the Buncombe County Jail, and in front of the Mediterranean Restaurant.

Release
The film was released in the United States on September 30, 2016. The film was previously scheduled to be released on August 14, 2015, August 7, 2015, and August 19, 2015, a date which, in July 2015, Relativity rescheduled to October 9, 2015. The company pushed back the date because it was facing a financial crisis. The film was pulled from the October 9, 2015 release date before being released on September 30, 2016.

Masterminds was released in North America on September 30, 2016. The film was projected to gross $10 million from 3,042 theaters in its opening weekend. The film made $2,325,546 on its first day. It went on to gross $6,541,205 in its opening weekend, finishing 6th at the box office.

The film went on to gross $29,674,699 worldwide against a $25 million production budget. Additional prints and advertising costs were estimated to be in excess of $20 million.

Reception
On Rotten Tomatoes the film has an approval rating of 34% based on reviews from 99 critics, with an average rating of 4.63/10. The site's critical consensus reads, "Masterminds great cast and stranger-than-fiction true story are largely wasted on a scattershot comedy with a handful of funny moments and far too much wackiness." On Metacritic, the film has a score of 47 out of 100 based on 29 critics, indicating "mixed or average reviews". Audiences polled by CinemaScore gave the film an average grade of "B−" on an A+ to F scale.

Peter Travers of Rolling Stone magazine gave the film one-and-a-half out of four stars, mainly criticizing its lack of good jokes: "The laughs evaporate almost as soon as they land, and some (make that most) of them don't land at all.... Masterminds owes us our two hours back." On the other hand, Matt Zoller Seitz of RogerEbert.com gave the film three out of four stars, stating that "If smart dumb comedies hold a place in your heart, you'll like 'Masterminds.'" Although he acknowledged the film's weakness in its length, structure, and pacing, he emphasized that "Most of the time in these kinds of films the notes of sweetness, naivete and regret feel forced.... Here, though, you believe the sweetness, because Hess and his cast sell it with poker faces." Richard Brody of The New Yorker also gave praise to the film, writing that "Yes, the comedy is funny—even when it’s not laugh-out-loud funny, it’s sparklingly inventive and charmingly loopy—but, above all, it has the religious intensity and spiritual resonance that marks all of Hess’s other films, and it extends his world of ideas into wild new realms, extends his vision into darker corners of existence than he had formerly contemplated." He also observed the filmmaking of Hess as "suggest[ing] a kinship with the transcendental cinema of Robert Bresson and Carl Theodor Dreyer.... his images belong to a similar realm of astonishment, even if his are frankly comedic where theirs are irreconcilably tragic."

The film was a finalist for an AML Award in film.

References

External links
 
 
 
 
 
 

2016 films
2016 comedy films
2010s crime comedy films
2010s heist films
American crime comedy films
American heist films
Comedy films based on actual events
Crime films based on actual events
Films directed by Jared Hess
Films produced by Lorne Michaels
Films scored by Geoff Zanelli
Films set in North Carolina
Films set in 1997
Films set in the 1990s
Films shot in North Carolina
Relativity Media films
Biographical films about criminals
2010s English-language films
2010s American films